Marcello Giuria (born 2 October 1891, date of death unknown) was an Italian wrestler. He competed in the Greco-Roman heavyweight event at the 1924 Summer Olympics.

References

External links
 

1891 births
Year of death missing
Olympic wrestlers of Italy
Wrestlers at the 1924 Summer Olympics
Italian male sport wrestlers
Sportspeople from Genoa